.ar is the Internet country code top-level domain (ccTLD) for Argentina. It is administered by NIC Argentina. Registering an .ar domain (like website.ar) directly is now allowed. Previously, only 9 of the second-level domains listed below were open for registration, and a local presence in Argentina was required. Recently the extension has become synonymous with Augmented Reality and is being by many prominent AR and XR startups.

Second-level domains
As of January 2017 there are currently 12 second-level domains.

 com.ar – Companies and individuals resident in Argentina
 coop.ar – Registered cooperatives
 edu.ar – Educational institutions. Currently, this second-level domain is handled by ARIU (Asociación de Redes de Interconexión Universitaria).
 gob.ar, gov.ar – Local and national government
 int.ar – International entities and representatives of foreign international organizations in Argentina
 mil.ar – Military use
 mutual.ar – Registered mutual organizations
 net.ar – Providers of internet services licensed by the Comisión Nacional de Comunicaciones
 org.ar – Non-profit organizations, which must present a valid proof
 senasa.ar – Legal and human persons related to the National Food Safety and Quality Service
 tur.ar – Tourism and travel companies licensed by the Ministerio de Turismo de la Nación. Provincial or municipal government agencies promoting their respective provinces or municipalities can also use this second-level domain.
 musica.ar – Any member listed in the National Registry of Musicians and National Musical Groups
 bet.ar – Online gambling operators, licensed by local and national government

Special characters
In November 2008, a resolution approved the use of special characters in domain names, including ñ, ç, á, é, í ó, ú, ä, ë, ï, ö, and ü. The .gob.ar domain was also approved for government entities (.gob stands for "gobierno", government in Spanish).

See also
Internet in Argentina

References

External links
 NIC Argentina
 Resolution N° 904/2008 about tur.ar domains
 IANA .ar whois information

Internet in Argentina
Country code top-level domains

sv:Toppdomän#A